Lut ibn Yahya ibn Sa'id ibn Mikhnaf al-Azdi, more commonly known by his kunya (epithet) Abu Mikhnaf was a reporter from the Golden era of Islam.

Life
His given name was Lut and his father was Yahya ibn Sa'id ibn Mikhnaf, who belonged to a noble clan of the powerful Azd tribe resident in Kufa. His great-grandfather was Mikhnaf ibn Sulaym, a chieftain of the Azd and the commander of his tribesmen in the army of Caliph Ali at the Battle of Siffin in 657. Mikhnaf's son Muhammad, Abu Mikhnaf's paternal granduncle, was seventeen-years-old at Siffin and his reports of the battle were recorded by Abu Mikhnaf. He witnessed the mass Iraqi revolt led by Ibn al-Ash'ath against the Umayyad Caliphate in 700 and the toppling of the Umayyads by the Abbasids in 750. He was a friend of Muhammad ibn Sa'id al-Kalbi and it was through the latter's son Hisham ibn al-Kalbi that much of Abu Mikhnaf's volumes were transmitted. He died in 774/75.

Historiography
Abu Mikhnaf was the oldest Arab prose writer, an Akhbari (propagator of news or traditions), an important source of early Iraqi historical traditions, and main source of the history of al-Tabari. Abu Mikhnaf is the latter’s almost exclusive source for the events in Iraq during the long governorship of al-Hajjaj ibn Yusuf (694–714), the Zubayrid and Umayyad conflict with the Azariqa rebels in Persia (684–698) and the expedition of Ibn al-Ash'ath against Sistan (699–700).

His historical narratives generally reflect a Kufan or Iraqi bias, rather than a purely Shia point of view.

He has presented narratives in abundance of details and fullness, in strikingly frank and arresting manner, in form of dialogue and staging, which he had gathered through independent enquiries, collection of facts and seeking first hand information, but he has not ignored other traditionists, older than or contemporary with himself, for instance, he has used such authorities as, Amir Al Shahi, Rasibi, Mugalid ibn Said, and Muhammad ib Said Al Kalbi.

Ibn Asakir in his book Ta'rikh madinat Dimashq has listed Ibn Al Kalbi as transmitter of Abu Mikhnaf in several places. Abd al-Malik ibn Nawfal ibn Musahiq who lived in first half of the second century Hijri, Abd al-Rahman ibn Jundab, al-Hajjaj ibn Ali, and Numayr ibn Walah were authority on Abu Mikhnaf.

In "Islamic Historiography", "Chase F. Robinson" has put him in the class of Ibn Ishaq and among the first Muslim historians who contributed about 40 titles in historical tradition of which no fewer than thirteen titles were monographic maqtal works. His monographs were gathered by later historians like Al-Baladhuri and Al-Tabari in their collections. Few of the later Sunni scholars like Al-Dhahabi, Yahya ibn Ma'in, Al-Daraqutni, and Abu Hatim have been critical of him, while some describe him as pure source.

As a hadith transmitter, he is regarded as weak and unreliable.

Works
Ibn Nadim in his al-Fihrist lists 22, and al-Najashi lists 28 monographs composed by Abu Mikhnaf, comprising:
Kitab Al-Saqifa (The book of Saqifah)
Kitab Al-Ridda (The book of Ridda wars)
Kitab Al-Shura (The book of The election of Uthman)
Kitab Al-Jamal (The book of Battle of Bassorah)
Kitab Al-Siffin (The book of Battle of Siffin)
Kitab Maqtal Al-Hasan
Kitab Maqtal Al-Husayn (The history of Battle of Karbala)
Sirat Al-Hussayn
Kitab Khutba Al-Zahra
Kitab Akhbar Al-Mukhtar
Futuh Al Sham (Conquest of Syria)

Maqtal Al-Husayn

He was the first historian to systematically collect the reports dealing with the events of the Battle of Karbala. His work was considered reliable among later Shi'a and Sunni historians like Tabari. He has based his work on the eyewitness testimony of Muhammad ibn Qays, Harith ibn Abd Allah ibn Sharik al-Amiri, Abd Allah ibn Asim and Dahhak ibn Abd Allah Abu, Abu Janab al-Kalbi and Adi b. Hurmula, Muhammad ibn Qays.

Futuh Al Sham
Various works titled Futuh Al Sham by Al Azdi, Ibn Al Kalbi, Ibn A'tham and Al Waqidi were based on Abu Mikhnaf's Futuh Al Sham. Both Ibn ʿAsākīr and Al-Balādhurī traced their narratives back to Abū Mikhnaf.

References

Bibliography

Robinson, Chase F. (2003), Cambridge University Press,

External links
 Biodata at MuslimScholars.info

709 births
770s deaths
8th-century Arabs
8th-century people from the Abbasid Caliphate
8th-century Arabic writers
8th-century people from the Umayyad Caliphate
Azd
People from Kufa
8th-century historians of the medieval Islamic world